Dan Karabin (born 18 February 1955) is a Slovak wrestler who competed for Czechoslovakia. He was born in Nitra. He won an Olympic bronze medal in Freestyle wrestling in 1980.

References

External links
 

1955 births
Living people
Sportspeople from Nitra
Slovak male sport wrestlers
Czechoslovak male sport wrestlers
Olympic wrestlers of Czechoslovakia
Wrestlers at the 1976 Summer Olympics
Wrestlers at the 1980 Summer Olympics
Czech male sport wrestlers
Olympic bronze medalists for Czechoslovakia
Olympic medalists in wrestling
Medalists at the 1980 Summer Olympics